Abalá Municipality (In the Yucatec Maya Language: “Place of the plum juice”) is one of the 106 municipalities in the Mexican state of Yucatán containing  (301.45 km2) of land and located roughly 50 km south of the city of Mérida.

History
After the conquest, during the colonial period, the Municipality of Abalá was founded as an encomienda first for Francisco de Montejo the Younger in 1549 and then in 1607 for Juan de Montejo Maldonado. The right to press the natives into labor then passed in 1632 to Conde-Duque of San Lucas, in 1633 to the Countess of Olivares, in 1699 to Mariana de Guzmán Duchess of Medina Cidoña, and in 1727 to  Doña Josefa Díaz Bolio who had control of 211 Indians.

In the modern era, the haciendas Maxal y Kambriche became part of the Muna Municipality on 18 April 1902.

On 20 January 1926, the cocoa farm and ranch Yaxcopoil are incorporated into the town of Umán but a decade later on 17 January 1936, the cocoa farm was restored to Abalá municipality.

Governance
The municipal president is elected for a three-year term. Four aldermen—Secretary, public works, nomenclature, and ecology—also serve on the town council.

Communities
The municipality is made up of 7 communities:

Local festivals
Every year from 10 to 17 May, Abalá holds a fiesta celebrating the Virgin Mary.

Tourist attractions
 Cave/Cenote Kankirixché
 Hacienda Nuestra Señora de la Soledad Pebá
 Hacienda San Pedro Ochil
 Hacienda Temozón Sur
 Hacienda Uayalceh
 Hacienda Cacao

Notables
Daniel Ayala Pérez

External links
 Cenote Kankirixche

References

Municipalities of Yucatán